Maverick is both a surname and a given name that is a transferred use of the British surname. It has connotations of individuality and stubborn independence and has been popularized due to its use for movie and television characters and sports teams.  A maverick is a term used for an unbranded range animal that reportedly originated with rancher Samuel Maverick, who did not practice livestock branding.

Usage
The name has been among the 1,000 most-used names for boys in the United States since 1994 and among the 50 most popular names for American boys since 2020. The name is also in use for girls in the United States, though it is in greater use for boys. There were 6,548 American boys named Maverick in 2021 compared with 97 American girls. 

Notable people with the name include:

Surname
Ed Maverick (born 2001), Mexican singer-songwriter
Kurd Maverick (born Cihan Ötün), German producer and DJ
Mary Maverick (1818–1898), Texas pioneer and diarist
Maury Maverick (1895–1954), US Congressman from Texas, who coined the word "gobbledygook"
Maury Maverick Jr. (1921–2003), Texas attorney, activist, and columnist
Samuel Maverick (1803–1870), Texas pioneer and land baron from whom the term maverick originated
Samuel Maverick Jr. (1837-1936), Texas soldier, businessman, and Alamo preservationist
Samuel Maverick (apprentice) (died 1770), a young man killed in the Boston Massacre
Samuel Maverick (colonist) (c. 1602 – c. 1670), English colonist in Massachusetts

Given name
Maverick Ahanmisi (born 1991), American basketball player
Maverick Antcliff (born 1993), Australian professional golfer
Maverick Banes (born 1992), Australian tennis player
Maverick Carter (born 1980), American businessman
Maverick McNealy (born 1995), American professional golfer
Maverick Morgan (born 1994), American basketball player
Maverick Rowan (born 1996), American basketball player
Maverick Sabre (born 1990), English singer-songwriter and rapper
Maverick Viñales (born 1995), Spanish motorcycle racer
Maverick Weller (born 1992), Australian rules footballer

Notes

English masculine given names